Christian Landry (born May 13, 1998 in Houston, Texas, U.S), popularly known by the stage name Chris Landry is an American rapper and songwriter currently based in Atlanta, U.S. In 2014, his debut mixtape titled Sky Scrapers was released to positive reviews thus gaining him new grounds. He is currently signed to Twenty Two Music Group.

Early life and education
Chris Landry was born in Texas where he attended Lee High School, Baytown, Texas as a freshman before he subsequently transferred to Sterling High School in his sophomore year.

Career
Chris Landry grew up listening to Bow Wow until he started writing songs while in school. In November 2011, Bobby V discovered Chris Landry on social media website Twitter and offered him a recording contract with Blu Kolla Dreams Records under which Chris went on to release his popular single titled "House Party". He cites Jay Z, Kanye West and Drake as his musical influences.

On November 16, 2012, Chris Landry released his first major project titled Just a Kid With a Dream. On January 31, 2014, he released a mixtape titled Sky Scrappers which featured acts like Bobby V, Fat Pimp, Travie Trav and Dontrell. On 13 June 2016, he went on to release a 12-track EP titled Something To Prove through his imprint Black Kings Entertainment. It was hosted by DJ Iceberg and DJ Frank White.

Discography

Selected singles

Mixtapes

EPs

References

External links

1995 births
Living people
Rappers from Houston
American hip hop musicians
American male rappers
American male singer-songwriters
Singer-songwriters from Texas
21st-century American rappers
21st-century American male musicians